Leslie Townes "Bob" Hope KBE, KC*SG, KSS (May 29, 1903 – July 27, 2003) was a British-born American comedian, vaudevillian, actor, singer, and dancer. With a career that spanned nearly 80 years, Hope appeared in more than 70 short and feature films—54 in which he starred. These included a series of seven Road to ... musical comedy films with Bing Crosby as Hope's top-billed partner.

In addition to hosting the Academy Awards show 19 times, more than any other host, Hope appeared in many stage productions and television roles and wrote 14 books. The song "Thanks for the Memory" was his signature tune.

Hope was born in the Eltham district of southeast London. He arrived in the United States with his family at the age of four, and grew up near Cleveland, Ohio. After a brief stint in the late 1910s as a boxer, Hope began his career in show business in the early 1920s, initially as a comedian and dancer on the vaudeville circuit, before acting on Broadway. Hope began appearing on radio and in films starting in 1934. He was praised for his comedic timing, specializing in one-liners and rapid-fire delivery of jokes that were often self-deprecating. He helped establish modern American stand-up comedy.

Between 1941 and 1991, Hope made 57 tours for the United Service Organizations (USO), entertaining active duty U.S. military personnel around the world. In 1997, the United States Congress passed a bill that made Hope an honorary veteran of the U.S. Armed Forces. Hope appeared in numerous television specials for NBC during his career and was one of the first users of cue cards.

Hope retired from public life in 1998 and died on July 27, 2003, at the age of 100.

Early years 

Leslie Townes Hope was born on May 29, 1903, in Eltham, County of London (now part of the Royal Borough of Greenwich), in a terraced house on Craigton Road in Well Hall, where there is now a blue plaque in his memory. He was the fifth of seven sons of an English father, William Henry Hope, a stonemason from Weston-super-Mare, Somerset, and a Welsh mother, Avis (née Townes), a light opera singer from Barry, Vale of Glamorgan, who later worked as a cleaner. William and Avis married in April 1891 and lived at 12 Greenwood Street in Barry before moving to Whitehall, Bristol, and then to St George, Bristol. After a brief period living in Southend Road, Weston-Super-Mare, in 1908, the family immigrated to the United States, sailing aboard the SS Philadelphia. They passed through Ellis Island, New York on March 30, 1908, before moving on to Cleveland, Ohio.

From age 12, Hope earned pocket money by busking (frequently on the streetcar to Luna Park), singing, dancing, and performing comedy. He entered numerous dancing and amateur talent contests as Lester Hope, and won a prize in 1915 for his impersonation of Charlie Chaplin. For a time, he attended the Boys' Industrial School in Lancaster, Ohio, and as an adult donated sizable sums of money to the institution. Hope had a brief career as a boxer in 1919, fighting under the name Packy East. He had three wins and one loss, and he participated in a few staged charity bouts later in life.

Hope worked as a butcher's assistant and a lineman in his teens and early 20s. He also had a brief stint at Chandler Motor Car Company. In 1921, while assisting his brother Jim in clearing trees for a power company, he was sitting atop a tree that crashed to the ground, crushing his face; the accident required Hope to undergo reconstructive surgery, which contributed to his later distinctive appearance.

After deciding on a show business career, Hope and his girlfriend signed up for dancing lessons. Encouraged after they performed in a three-day engagement at a club, Hope formed a partnership with Lloyd Durbin, a friend from the dancing school. Silent film comedian Fatty Arbuckle saw them perform in 1925 and found them work with a touring troupe called Hurley's Jolly Follies. Within a year, Hope had formed an act called the "Dancemedians" with George Byrne and the Hilton Sisters, conjoined twins who performed a tap-dancing routine on the vaudeville circuit. Hope and Byrne also had an act as Siamese twins; they sang and danced while wearing blackface until friends advised Hope he was funnier as himself.

In 1929, Hope informally changed his first name to "Bob". In one version of the story, he named himself after racecar driver Bob Burman. In another, he said he chose the name because he wanted a name with a "friendly 'Hiya, fellas!' sound" to it. In a 1942 legal document, his legal name appears as Lester Townes Hope; it is unknown if this reflects a legal name change from Leslie. After five years on the vaudeville circuit, Hope was "surprised and humbled" when he failed a 1930 screen test for the RKO-Pathé short-subject studio at Culver City, California.

Career 
In the early days, Hope's career included appearances on stage in vaudeville shows and Broadway productions. He began performing on the radio in 1934 mostly with NBC radio, and switched to television when that medium became popular in the 1950s. He started hosting regular TV specials in 1954, and hosted the Academy Awards nineteen times from 1939 through 1977.  Overlapping with this was his movie career, spanning 1934 to 1972, and his USO tours, which he conducted from 1941 to 1991.

Film 

Hope signed a contract with Educational Pictures of New York for six short comedies. The first was a comedy, Going Spanish (1934). He was not happy with it, and told newspaper columnist Walter Winchell, "When they catch [bank robber]  Dillinger, they're going to make him sit through it twice." Educational Pictures took umbrage at the remark and canceled Hope's contract after only the one film. He soon signed with the Vitaphone short-subject studio in Brooklyn, New York, making musical and comedy shorts during the day and performing in Broadway shows in the evenings.

Hope moved to Hollywood when Paramount Pictures signed him for the 1938 film The Big Broadcast of 1938, also starring W. C. Fields. The song "Thanks for the Memory", which later became his trademark, was introduced in the film as a duet with Shirley Ross, accompanied by Shep Fields and his orchestra. The sentimental, fluid nature of the music allowed Hope's writers—he depended heavily upon joke writers throughout his career—to later create variations of the song to fit specific circumstances, such as bidding farewell to troops while on tour or mentioning the names of towns in which he was performing.

As a film star, Hope was best known for such comedies as My Favorite Brunette and the highly successful "Road" movies in which he starred with Bing Crosby and Dorothy Lamour. The series consists of seven films made between 1940 and 1962: Road to Singapore (1940), Road to Zanzibar (1941), Road to Morocco (1942), Road to Utopia (1946), Road to Rio (1947), Road to Bali (1952), and The Road to Hong Kong (1962). At the outset, Paramount executives were amazed at how relaxed and compatible Hope and Crosby were as a team. What the executives didn't know was that Hope and Crosby had already worked together (on the vaudeville stage in 1932), and that working so easily in the "Road" pictures was just an extension of their old stage act. 

Hope had seen Lamour performing as a nightclub singer in New York, and invited her to work on his United Service Organizations (USO) tours of military facilities. Lamour sometimes arrived for filming prepared with her lines, only to be baffled by completely rewritten scripts or ad-libbed dialogue between Hope and Crosby. Hope and Lamour were lifelong friends, and she remains the actress most associated with his film career although he made movies with dozens of leading ladies, including Katharine Hepburn, Paulette Goddard, Hedy Lamarr, Lucille Ball, Rosemary Clooney, Jane Russell, and Elke Sommer.

Hope and Crosby teamed not only for the "Road" pictures, but for many stage, radio, and television appearances and many brief movie appearances together over the decades  until Crosby died in 1977. Although the two invested together in oil leases and other business ventures, worked together frequently, and lived near each other, they rarely saw each other socially.

After the release of Road to Singapore (1940), Hope's screen career took off, and he had a long and successful run. After an 11-year hiatus from the "Road" genre, he and Crosby reteamed for The Road to Hong Kong (1962), starring the 28-year-old Joan Collins in place of Lamour, whom Crosby thought was too old for the part. They had planned one more movie together in 1977, The Road to the Fountain of Youth, but filming was postponed when Crosby was injured in a fall, and the production was canceled when he suddenly died of heart failure that October.

Hope starred in 54 theatrical features between 1938 and 1972, as well as cameos and short films. Most of his later movies failed to match the success of his 1940s efforts. He was disappointed with his appearance in Cancel My Reservation (1972), his last starring film; critics and filmgoers panned the movie.  Though his career as a film star effectively ended in 1972, he did make a few cameo film appearances into the 1980s.

Hope was host of the Academy Awards ceremony 19 times between 1939 and 1977. His supposedly-feigned desire for an Oscar became part of his act. While introducing the 1968 telecast, he quipped, "Welcome to the Academy Awards, or, as it's known at my house, Passover." Although he was never nominated for an Oscar, the Academy of Motion Picture Arts and Sciences honored him with four honorary awards, and in 1960 presented him with the Jean Hersholt Humanitarian Award, given each year as part of the Oscars ceremony.

Broadcasting 

Hope's career in broadcasting began on radio in 1934. His first regular series for NBC Radio was the Woodbury Soap Hour in 1937, on a 26-week contract. Serving as the master of ceremonies for these Rippling Rhythm Revue radio broadcasts, Hope collaborated with the big band leader Shep Fields during this period of transition from vaudeville to radio.  A year later, The Pepsodent Show Starring Bob Hope began, and Hope signed a ten-year contract with the show's sponsor, Lever Brothers. He hired eight writers and paid them out of his salary of $2,500 a week. The original staff included Mel Shavelson, Norman Panama, Jack Rose, Sherwood Schwartz, and Schwartz's brother Al. The writing staff eventually grew to fifteen. The show became the top radio program in the country. Regulars on the series included Jerry Colonna and Barbara Jo Allen as spinster Vera Vague. Hope continued his lucrative career in radio into the 1950s, when radio's popularity began being overshadowed by the upstart television medium.

Television specials 

Hope did many specials for the NBC television network in the following decades, beginning in April 1950. He was one of the first people to use cue cards. The shows often were sponsored by Frigidaire (early 1950s), General Motors (1955–61), Chrysler (1963–73), and Texaco (1975–85). Hope's Christmas specials were popular favorites and often featured a performance of "Silver Bells"—from his 1951 film The Lemon Drop Kid—done as a duet with an often much younger female guest star such as Barbara Mandrell, Olivia Newton-John, Barbara Eden, and Brooke Shields, or with his wife Dolores, a former singer with whom he dueted on two specials.

On April 26, 1970, CBS released the Raquel Welch television special Raquel!; in it Hope appears as a guest.

Hope's 1970 and 1971 Christmas specials for NBC—filmed in Vietnam in front of military audiences at the height of the war—are on the list of the Top 46 U.S. network prime-time telecasts. Both were seen by more than 60 percent of the U.S. households watching television.

The Adventures of Bob Hope 

Beginning in early 1950, Hope licensed rights to publish a celebrity comic book titled The Adventures of Bob Hope to National Periodical Publications, alias DC Comics. The comic, originally featuring publicity stills of Hope on the cover, was entirely made up of fictional stories, eventually including fictitious relatives, a high school taught by movie monsters, and a superhero called Super-Hip. It was published intermittently and continued publication through issue #109 in 1969. Illustrators included Bob Oksner and (for the last four issues) Neal Adams.

USO involvement 

While aboard the RMS Queen Mary when World War II began in September 1939, Hope volunteered to perform a special show for the passengers, during which he sang "Thanks for the Memory" with rewritten lyrics. He performed his first USO show on May 6, 1941, at March Field in California, and continued to travel and entertain troops for the rest of World War II, later during the Korean War, the Vietnam War, the third phase of the Lebanon Civil War, the latter years of the Iran–Iraq War, and the 1990–91 Persian Gulf War. His USO career lasted a half-century during which he headlined 57 times.

He had a deep respect for the men and women who served in the armed forces, and this was reflected in his willingness to go anywhere to entertain them. However, during the highly controversial Vietnam War, Hope had trouble convincing some performers to join him on tour, but he was accompanied on at least one USO tour by Ann-Margret. Anti-war sentiment was high, and his pro-troop stance made him a target of criticism from some quarters. Some shows were drowned out by boos, others were listened to in silence.

The tours were funded by the U.S. Department of Defense, Hope's television sponsors, and by NBC, the network that  broadcast the television specials created after each tour from footage shot on location. However, the footage and shows were owned by Hope's own production company, which made them very lucrative ventures for him, as outlined by writer Richard Zoglin in his 2014 biography Hope: Entertainer of the Century.

Hope sometimes recruited his own family members for USO travel. His wife, Dolores, sang from atop an armored vehicle during the Desert Storm tour, and granddaughter Miranda appeared alongside him on an aircraft carrier in the Indian Ocean. Of Hope's USO shows in World War II, novelist John Steinbeck, who then was working as a war correspondent, wrote in 1943:

Along with his best friend Bing Crosby, Hope was offered a commission in the United States Navy as lieutenant commander during World War II, but FDR intervened, believing it would be better for troop morale if they kept doing what they were doing by playing for all branches of military service.

For his service to his nation through the USO, he was awarded the Sylvanus Thayer Award by the United States Military Academy at West Point in 1968, the first entertainer to receive the award. A 1997 act of Congress signed by President Bill Clinton named Hope an "Honorary Veteran". He remarked, "I've been given many awards in my lifetime, but to be numbered among the men and women I admire most is the greatest honor I have ever received." In an homage to Hope, comedian/TV host Stephen Colbert carried a golf club on stage during the week of USO performances he taped for his TV show The Colbert Report during the 2009 season.

Dear Bob... Bob Hope's Wartime Correspondence with the G.I.s of WW2, written by Martha Bolton (first woman staff writer for Bob Hope) and Linda Hope (eldest daughter of Bob Hope), reveals the heart of the entertainer who became a best friend to the troops.

Theater 
Hope's first Broadway appearances, in 1927's The Sidewalks of New York and 1928's Ups-a-Daisy, were minor walk-on parts.  He returned to Broadway in 1933 to star as Huckleberry Haines in the Jerome Kern / Dorothy Fields musical Roberta. Stints in the musicals Say When, the 1936 Ziegfeld Follies with Fanny Brice, and Red, Hot and Blue with Ethel Merman and Jimmy Durante followed. Hope reprised his role as Huck Haines in a 1958 production of Roberta at The Muny Theater in Forest Park in  St. Louis, Missouri.

Additionally, Hope rescued the Eltham Little Theatre in England from closure by providing funds to buy the property. He continued his interest and support, and regularly visited the facility when in London. The theater was renamed in his honor in 1982.

Sports car racing
During a short stint in 1960, Hope became a part owner of the Riverside International Raceway in Moreno Valley, California, along with Los Angeles Rams co-owner Fred Levy Jr. and oil tycoon Ed Pauley for $800,000 (adjusted to $6,951,567.57 in 2020). Les Richter was made president of the raceway.

Later appearances

Hope made a guest appearance on The Golden Girls, season 4, episode 17 (aired February 25, 1989) called "You Gotta Have Hope" in which Rose is convinced Bob Hope is her father. In 1992, Hope made a guest appearance as himself on the animated Fox series The Simpsons in the episode  "Lisa the Beauty Queen" (season 4, episode 4). His 90th birthday television celebration in May 1993, Bob Hope: The First 90 Years, won an Emmy Award for Outstanding Variety, Music Or Comedy Special. Toward the end of his career, worsening vision problems rendered him unable to read his cue cards. In October 1996, he announced he was ending his 60-year contract with NBC, joking that he "decided to become a free agent". His final television special, Laughing with the Presidents, was broadcast in November 1996, with host Tony Danza helping him present a personal retrospective of presidents of the United States known to Hope, a frequent White House visitor over the years. The special, though different from his usual specials, received high praise from Variety, as well as other reviews. Following a brief appearance at the 50th Primetime Emmy Awards in 1997, Hope made his last TV appearance in a 1997 commercial about the introduction of Big Kmart, directed by Penny Marshall.

Legacy 

Hope helped establish modern American stand-up comedy. He was widely praised for his comedic timing and his specialization in the use of one-liners and rapid-fire delivery of jokes. He was known for his style of self-deprecating jokes, first building himself up and then tearing himself down. He performed hundreds of times per year.  Such early films as The Cat and the Canary (1939) and The Paleface (1948) were financially successful and praised by critics, and by the mid-1940s, with his radio program getting good ratings as well, he was one of the most popular entertainers in the United States. When Paramount threatened to stop production of the "Road" pictures in 1945, they received 75,000 letters of protest.

Hope had no faith in his skills as a dramatic actor, and his performances of that type were not as well received. He had been well known in radio until the late 1940s; however, as his ratings began to slip in the 1950s, he switched to television and became an early pioneer of that medium. He published several books, notably dictating to ghostwriters about his wartime experiences.

Although Hope made an effort to keep his material up to date, he never adapted his comic persona or his routines to any great degree. As Hollywood began to transition to the "New Hollywood" era in the 1960s, he reacted negatively, such as when he hosted the 40th Academy Awards in 1968 and voiced his contempt by mocking the show's delay because of the assassination of Martin Luther King Jr. and condescendingly greeted attending younger actors on stage—such as Dustin Hoffman, who was 30 at the time—as children. By the 1970s, his popularity was beginning to wane with military personnel and with the movie-going public in general. However, he continued doing USO tours into the 1980s and continued to appear on television into the 1990s. Former First Lady Nancy Reagan, a close friend and frequent host to him at the White House, called Hope  "America's most honored citizen and our favorite clown".

Hope was well known as an avid golfer, playing in as many as 150 charity tournaments a year. Introduced to the game in the 1930s while performing in Winnipeg, Canada, he eventually played to a four handicap. His love for the game—and the humor he could find in it—made him a sought-after foursome member. He once remarked that President Dwight D. Eisenhower gave up golf for painting: "Fewer strokes, you know." He also was quoted as saying, "It's wonderful how you can start out with three strangers in the morning, play 18 holes, and by the time the day is over you have three solid enemies."

A golf club became an integral prop for Hope during the standup segments of his television specials and USO shows. In 1978 he putted against the then-two-year-old Tiger Woods in a television appearance with the actor Jimmy Stewart on The Mike Douglas Show.

The Bob Hope Classic, founded in 1960, made history in 1995 when Hope teed up for the opening round in a foursome that included Presidents Gerald Ford, George H. W. Bush, and Bill Clinton, the only time three U.S. presidents played in the same golf foursome.  The event, now known as the CareerBuilder Challenge, was one of the few PGA Tour tournaments that took place over five rounds, until the 2012 tournament when it was cut back to the conventional four.

Hope had a heavy interest in sports beyond golf and his brief fling as a professional boxer in his youth. In 1946, he bought a small stake in the Cleveland Indians professional baseball team and held it for most of the rest of his life. He appeared on the June 3, 1963, cover of Sports Illustrated magazine wearing an Indians uniform, and sang a special version of "Thanks for the Memory" after the Indians' last game at Cleveland Stadium on October 3, 1993. He also bought a share with Bing Crosby of the Los Angeles Rams football team in 1947, but sold it in 1962. He frequently used his television specials to promote the annual AP College Football All-America Team. The players would come onstage one by one and introduce themselves, then Hope, often dressed in a football uniform, would give a one-liner about the player or his school.

Personal life

Marriage 

Hope was briefly married to vaudeville partner Grace Louise Troxell (1912–1992), a secretary from Chicago, Illinois, who was the daughter of Edward and Mary (McGinnes) Troxell. They were married on January 25, 1933, in Erie, Pennsylvania. They divorced in November 1934.

The couple had shared headliner status with Joe Howard at the Palace Theatre in April 1931, performing "Keep Smiling" and the "Antics of 1931". They worked together at the RKO Albee, performing the "Antics of 1933" along with Ann Gillens and Johnny Peters in June of that year. The following month, singer Dolores Reade joined Hope's vaudeville troupe and was performing with him at Loew's Metropolitan Theater. She was described as a "former Ziegfeld beauty and one of society's favorite nightclub entertainers, having appeared at many private social functions at New York, Palm Beach, and Southampton".

His long-alleged marriage to Reade was fraught with ambiguities. As Richard Zoglin wrote in his 2014 biography Hope: Entertainer of the Century, 
  
Dolores had been one of Hope's co-stars on Broadway in Roberta. The couple adopted four children: Linda (in 1939), Tony (1940), Kelly (1946), and Eleanora,  known as Nora (1946). Bob and Dolores were also the legal guardians of Tracey, the youngest daughter of famous New York City bar owner Bernard "Toots" Shor and his wife, Marion "Baby" Shor.

In 1935, the couple lived in Manhattan. In 1937, they moved to 10346 Moorpark Street in the Toluca Lake neighborhood of Los Angeles, where they would reside until their respective deaths.

Extramarital affairs 

Hope had a reputation as a womanizer and continued to see other women throughout his marriage. Zoglin wrote, "Bob Hope had affairs with chorus girls, beauty queens, singers and showbiz wannabes through his 70s; he had a different girl on his arm every night. He was still having affairs into his 80s..."

As just one example among many, in 1949 while Hope was in Dallas on a publicity tour for his radio show, he met Barbara Payton, a contract player at Universal Studios, who at the time was on her own public relations jaunt. Shortly thereafter, Hope set up Payton in an apartment in Hollywood. The arrangement soured as Hope was not able to satisfy Payton's definition of generosity and her need for attention. Hope paid her off to end the affair quietly. Payton later revealed the affair in an article printed in July 1956 in the tell-all magazine Confidential. "Hope was ... at times a mean-spirited individual with the ability to respond with a ruthless vengeance when sufficiently provoked." His advisors counseled him to avoid further publicity by ignoring the Confidential exposé. "Barbara's ... revelations caused a minor ripple ... and then quickly sank without causing any appreciable damage to Bob Hope's legendary career."

According to Arthur Marx's 1993 Hope biography, The Secret Life of Bob Hope, Hope's subsequent long-term affair with actress Marilyn Maxwell was so open that the Hollywood community routinely referred to her as "Mrs. Bob Hope".

Rosemarie Frankland was a beauty queen (Miss World 1961) who, according to Zoglin, took part in a 30-year affair with Hope. He said she was "the great love of his life".

Hope's infidelities are a part of the plot of the 2020 film Misbehaviour, which follows the Women's Liberation protests at the Miss World 1970 competition that Hope hosted; Greg Kinnear plays Hope.

Vision philanthropy 

Hope, who suffered from vision problems for much of his adult life, served as an active honorary chairman on the board of Fight for Sight, a nonprofit organization in the United States which funds medical research in vision and ophthalmology. He hosted its Lights On telecast in 1960 and donated $100,000 to establish the Bob Hope Fight for Sight Fund. Hope recruited numerous top celebrities for the annual "Lights On" fundraiser. As an example, he hosted boxing champion Joe Frazier, actress Yvonne De Carlo, and singer-actor Sergio Franchi as headliners for the April 25, 1971, show at Philharmonic Hall in Milwaukee.

Last years and death 

Hope continued an active entertainment career past his 90th birthday, concentrating on his television specials and USO tours. Although he had given up starring in feature films after Cancel My Reservation, he made several cameos in various films and co-starred with Don Ameche in the 1986 television film A Masterpiece of Murder. A television special created for his 80th birthday in 1983 at the Kennedy Center in Washington, D.C., featured President Ronald Reagan, actress Lucille Ball, comedian-actor-writer George Burns (a fellow centenarian), and many others. In 1985 he was presented with the Life Achievement Award at the Kennedy Center Honors, and in 1998 he was appointed an honorary Knight Commander of the Most Excellent Order of the British Empire (KBE) by Queen Elizabeth II. Upon accepting the appointment, Hope quipped, "I'm speechless. 70 years of ad lib material and I'm speechless."

In July 1997 at age 94, he attended the funeral of Jimmy Stewart, where many pointed out his frail appearance. At the age of 95, Hope made an appearance at the 50th anniversary of the Primetime Emmy Awards with Milton Berle and Sid Caesar. Contemporaries Fay Wray and Gloria Stuart were also present. Two years later, he was present at the opening of the Bob Hope Gallery of American Entertainment at the Library of Congress. The Library of Congress has presented two major exhibitions about Hope's life: "Hope for America: Performers, Politics and Pop Culture" and "Bob Hope and American Variety". He last made an appearance at the Hope Classic in 2000, where he hugged Swedish golfer Jesper Parnevik. In August 2001, Hope was hospitalized for pneumonia.

Hope celebrated his 100th birthday on May 29, 2003. To mark this event, the intersection of Hollywood and Vine in Los Angeles was named "Bob Hope Square" and his centennial was declared "Bob Hope Day" in 35 states. Even at 100, Hope maintained his self-deprecating sense of humor, quipping, "I'm so old, they've canceled my blood type."

Hope converted to Catholicism seven years before his death.

In 1998, five years before his death, a prepared obituary written by the Associated Press was inadvertently released, resulting in Hope's death being announced on the floor of the U.S. House of Representatives. However, Hope remained in relatively good health until late in his old age, though he became somewhat frail in his last few years. In June 2000 at age 97, he spent nearly a week in a California hospital being treated for gastrointestinal bleeding. In  August 2001 at age 98, he spent close to two weeks in a hospital recovering from pneumonia.

On the morning of July 27, 2003, Hope died of pneumonia at his home in Toluca Lake, California two months after his 100th birthday. His grandson Zach Hope told TV interviewer Soledad O'Brien that, when asked on his deathbed where he wanted to be buried, Hope is alleged to have told his wife, Dolores, "Surprise me." His remains were temporarily placed in a mausoleum vault before the construction of the Bob Hope Memorial Garden at San Fernando Mission Cemetery in Los Angeles, joined in 2011 by Dolores when she died four months after her 102nd birthday. After his death, newspaper cartoonists worldwide paid tribute to his work for the USO, and some featured drawings of Bing Crosby, who had died in 1977, welcoming Hope to Heaven.

Estate 
Hope's Modernist  home, built to resemble a volcano, was designed in 1973 by John Lautner. It is located above Palm Springs, with panoramic views of the Coachella Valley and the San Jacinto Mountains. It was put on the market for the first time in February 2013 with an asking price of $50 million. Hope also owned a home which had been custom built for him in 1939 on an  lot in Toluca Lake. That house was put on the market in late 2012. The Palm Springs house sold in November 2016 for $13 million to investor Ron Burkle, far below its 2013 asking price.

Awards and honors 

Hope was awarded more than 2,000 honors and awards, including 54 honorary university doctorates. In 1963 President John F. Kennedy awarded him the Congressional Gold Medal for service to his country. President Lyndon Johnson bestowed the Presidential Medal of Freedom in 1969 for his service to the armed forces through the USO. In 1982 he received the S. Roger Horchow Award for Greatest Public Service by a Private Citizen, an honor given annually by Jefferson Awards. He was presented with the National Medal of Arts in 1995 and received the Ronald Reagan Freedom Award in 1997. On June 10, 1980, he became the 64th—and only civilian—recipient of the United States Air Force Order of the Sword which recognizes individuals who have made significant contributions to the enlisted corps.

Several buildings and facilities were renamed for Hope, including the historic Fox Theater in downtown Stockton, California, and the Bob Hope Airport in Burbank, California. There is a Bob Hope Gallery at the Library of Congress. In memory of his mother, Avis Townes Hope, Bob and Dolores Hope gave the Basilica of the National Shrine of the Immaculate Conception in Washington, D.C., a chapel called the Chapel of Our Lady of Hope.  of the U.S. Military Sealift Command was named for the performer in 1997. It is one of very few U.S. naval ships that were named after living people. The Air Force named a C-17 Globemaster III transport aircraft the Spirit of Bob Hope.

In 1965, he was awarded an honorary Doctor of Humane Letters (L.H.D.) degree from Whittier College.

In 1978, Hope was invited to dot the "i" in the Ohio State University Marching Band's "Script Ohio" formation, an honor only given to non-band members on 14 occasions from 1936 through 2016. The New York Times, 5–8–79, p. C 7, stated that Woody Allen wrote and narrated a documentary honoring him, My Favorite Comedian, shown at Lincoln Center. In Hope's hometown of Cleveland, the refurbished Lorain-Carnegie Bridge was renamed the Hope Memorial Bridge in 1983, though differing claims have been made as to whether the bridge honors Hope himself, his entire family, or his stonemason father who helped in the bridge's construction.  Also, East 14th Street near Playhouse Square in Cleveland's theater district was renamed Memory Lane-Bob Hope Way in 2003 in honor of the entertainer's 100th birthday.

In 1992, Hope was honored with the "Lombardi Award of Excellence" from the Vince Lombardi Cancer Foundation. The award was created to honor the football coach's legacy, and is awarded annually to an individual who exemplifies his spirit. He was also inducted into Omicron Delta Kappa, the National Leadership Honor Society, in 1992 at Ferris State University. On May 28, 2003, President George W. Bush established the Bob Hope American Patriot Award.

Academy Awards 
Although he was never nominated for a competitive Oscar, Hope was given five honorary awards by the Academy of Motion Picture Arts and Sciences:
 13th Academy Awards (1940): Special Award in recognition of his unselfish services to the motion picture industry
 17th Academy Awards (1944): Special Award for his many services to the Academy
 25th Academy Awards (1952): Honorary Award for his contribution to the laughter of the world, his service to the motion picture industry, and his devotion to the American premise
 32nd Academy Awards (1959): Jean Hersholt Humanitarian Award
 38th Academy Awards (1965): Honorary Award: first Academy Gold Medal for unique and distinguished service to the industry and the Academy

Discography

Singles

See also 
 Bob Hope bibliography
 Bob Hope television specials

References

Bibliography

 
 
 
 
 
 
 
 
 
 
 
 
 
 Hope, Bob (1985). Confessions of a Hooker: My Lifelong Love Affair with Golf.  New York: Doubleday.

Further reading 
 Perret, Gene and Bolton, Martha (1998) Talk About Hope, California, Jester Press, ISBN 978-1-8886-8802-3  

 
 
 
Bolton, Martha (2021), Hope, Linda (2021) Dear Bob... Bob Hope's Wartime Correspondence with the G.I.s of WW2, Mississippi, University Press of Mississippi, ISBN 978-1-4968-3265-8

External links 

 
 
 
 
 
 Congressional Gold Medal Recipients
 Law making Bob Hope an honorary veteran

 
1903 births
2003 deaths
20th-century American comedians
20th-century American male actors
20th-century American singers
Academy Honorary Award recipients
Actors awarded knighthoods
American burlesque performers
American centenarians
American male boxers
American male comedy actors
American male dancers
American male film actors
American male radio actors
American male singers
American male television actors
American people of Welsh descent
American radio personalities
American Roman Catholics
American comedians
Beauty pageant hosts
Burials at San Fernando Mission Cemetery
California Republicans
Cecil B. DeMille Award Golden Globe winners
Congressional Gold Medal recipients
Converts to Roman Catholicism
Deaths from pneumonia in California
British centenarians
British expatriate male actors in the United States
20th-century English comedians
20th-century English male actors
20th-century English singers
English emigrants to the United States
English male boxers
English male dancers
English male film actors
English male television actors
English Roman Catholics
English people of Welsh descent
Comedians from London
Male actors from London
Singers from London
Musicians from London
RCA Victor artists
Honorary Knights Commander of the Order of the British Empire
Jean Hersholt Humanitarian Award winners
Kennedy Center honorees
Knights Commander with Star of the Order of St. Gregory the Great
Men centenarians
Paramount Pictures contract players
Peabody Award winners
People from Eltham
People from Toluca Lake, Los Angeles
People with acquired American citizenship
Presidential Medal of Freedom recipients
Recipients of the Order of the Sword (United States)
Recipients of the Ronald Reagan Freedom Award
Screen Actors Guild Life Achievement Award
United States National Medal of Arts recipients
United Service Organizations entertainers
Vaudeville performers
Super-featherweight boxers
World Golf Hall of Fame inductees